.мкд (Punycode .xn--d1alf, latinized: .mkd) is the internationalized Internet country code top-level domain (ccTLD) for North Macedonia. It is administered by The Macedonian Academic Research Network (MARnet). In November 2012, MARnet announced that the agency was planning to introduce a national Cyrillic domain. Additionally, the agency started with the process of gathering proposals from the Macedonian citizens about the form of the domain which will be applied for official registration.  The call started on 19 November 2012 and ended on 3 December 2012.  The Cyrillic domain needs to contain letters of the country's name.  On 3 December, MarNet has choose six proposals (.мкд, .мак, .македонија, .рмкд, .рм and .рмак).  In this second phase of the process, the Macedonian citizens voted for the final Macedonian Cyrillic domain. The winning proposal was officially announced in January 2013.

This also relates to the .mk domain, which is also owned by MARnet.

Final results 
In the final phase of choosing the national Cyrillic domain, there were six domains. During the voting period, 2,288 votes were registered and the final results were announced on the official MARnet website.

The domain .мкд was officially approved and registered on 20 March 2014.

References

мкд
Communications in North Macedonia